The Ryan White Story is a 1989 American made-for-television biographical drama film starring Lukas Haas, and Judith Light, directed by John Herzfeld. The film first aired on the ABC network on January 16, 1989. It is based on the true story of the American teenager Ryan White, who became a national poster child for HIV/AIDS in the United States, after being expelled from middle school because of his infection. Nielsen ratings estimated that the movie was seen by 15 million viewers on the original airing.

Upon airing, some residents of White's hometown of Kokomo, Indiana felt that the film unfairly portrayed the town in a negative light. The office of Kokomo mayor Robert F. Sargent was flooded with complaints from across the country. Others in the film included Nikki Cox as Ryan's sister Andrea, Sarah Jessica Parker as a sympathetic nurse, George Dzundza as Ryan's doctor, and George C. Scott as Ryan's attorney, who legally argued against school board authorities. The real life Ryan White made a cameo appearance in the film as another hemophiliac AIDS sufferer named Chad. The film's final scene was filmed at South Iredell High School in Statesville, North Carolina. After its airing, the film was released on VHS in the UK.

Plot
Ryan White is a teenage hemophiliac who discovers he has contracted AIDS through contaminated blood products and is then barred from attending school by Western School Corporation in Russiaville, Indiana, just outside Kokomo. Ryan and his mother engage the services of a high-powered attorney to win back his basic rights to attend school. This turns into a prolonged legal battle of multiple appeals, which ends with Ryan being allowed to attend school on the condition he use disposable flatware in the cafeteria and is exempted from physical education. However, Ryan and his family also must deal with bigotry and unfair judgements against them due to the gossip and lack of knowledge about AIDS. The film ends with Ryan's mother getting a house in a nearby community and Ryan beginning high school, where he is warmly greeted by the students having been educated about AIDS awareness.

Cast
 Lukas Haas as Ryan White
 Judith Light as Jeanne White
 Nikki Cox as Andrea White
 Michael Bowen as Harley
 George Dzundza as Dr. Kleiman
 Sarah Jessica Parker as Laura
 Ryan White as Chad
 Mitch Ryan as Tom
 Grace Zabriskie as Gloria White
 George C. Scott as Charles Vaughan Sr
 Kathy Wagner as Sue Hatch
 Casey Ellison as Heath

Reception
The film received positive reviews from critics upon the original airing. The New York Times gave a favorable review upon release, stating 

Hal Erickson of AllMovie gave the film four out of five stars and said: "Despite its inherent sadness, The Ryan White Story is a celebration of an exceptional young human being whose short life touched so many others in a positive, uplifting manner."

References

External links
 

1989 television films
1989 films
1989 drama films
Drama films based on actual events
HIV/AIDS in American films
American television films
American biographical drama films
Works about contaminated haemophilia blood products
HIV/AIDS in television
Films set in 1985
Films set in 1986
ABC Motion Pictures films
Films set in Indiana
1980s English-language films
1980s American films